is a Japanese professional footballer who plays as a midfielder for South Korean club Bucheon FC 1995.

Mainly acting as a central midfielder, he can also play in more offensive or more defensive positions of the midfield.

Club career

Albirex Niigata (S)

After graduating from Juntendo University, Murofushi signed for Albirex Niigata Singapore, despite he originally intended to go to the United States to take trials.

He debuted in the local Premier League on March 31, 2018, playing the entirety of the match against Tampines Rovers, ended in a 2-1 win for his side. His first goal came on April 14, when he took part in the White Swans' 2-0 win against DPMM, while he scored his first brace on June 3, in another victory (5-0) against the same team. He also scored two consecutive braces in the semi-final and the final of the local cup, eventually won by Albirex.

With a total amount of 28 appearances and 13 goals, Murofushi played a considerable role in the White Swans brilliant season, which saw his team win all three domestic trophies (the SPL, the Singapore Cup and the Singapore Community Shield) completely unbeaten, while he was awarded as the Player of the Year, as well as nominated by fans for the league's Best XI.

York9
On January 22, 2019, Murofushi signed with Canadian side York9 (later renamed York United), which was set to participate in the debut season of the national Premier League. He made his debut in the CPL's inaugural match, when York9 played against Forge FC on April 27, 2019, while he scored his first goal for York on August 25, 2019 against FC Edmonton. With a total amount of 23 appearances and three goals, the Japanese was involved in the team's historic first season, ended in sixth place in the Spring round and in third place in the Autumn round. He also played six times in the Canadian Championship, where York reached the third qualifying round before being eliminated by the Montreal Impact after a two-legged tie.

Although the second season of the CPL was postponed and later rescheduled due to the consequences of the COVID-19 pandemic, Murofushi was still able to join York for the so-called "Island Games" (as a shortened edition of the CPL was entirely organized in Charlottetown, on the Prince Edward Island) and played in all of the seven matches his team was involved in, without scoring a single goal. However, York9 failed to progress to the second round of the competition as they finished in fifth place, just one point behind last-qualified Pacific.

Bucheon
On 9 February 2021, Murofushi signed with South Korean side Bucheon FC 1995, which was set to play in K League 2, for an undisclosed fee.

Career statistics

HonoursAlbirex Niigata (S)Singapore Premier League: 2018
Singapore Cup: 2018
Singapore Community Shield: 2018Individual'
SPL Player of the Year: 2018
SPL Fan XI: 2018

References

External links
 

1995 births
Living people
Association football midfielders
Japanese footballers
Association football people from Aichi Prefecture
Japanese expatriate footballers
Expatriate footballers in Singapore
Japanese expatriate sportspeople in Singapore
Expatriate soccer players in Canada
Japanese expatriate sportspeople in Canada
Expatriate footballers in South Korea
Japanese expatriate sportspeople in South Korea
Juntendo University alumni
Albirex Niigata Singapore FC players
York United FC players
Bucheon FC 1995 players
Singapore Premier League players
Canadian Premier League players